This is a list of most likely gravitationally rounded objects of the Solar System, which are objects that have a rounded, ellipsoidal shape due to their own gravity (but are not necessarily in hydrostatic equilibrium). Apart from the Sun itself, these objects qualify as planets according to common geophysical definitions of that term. The sizes of these objects range over three orders of magnitude in radius, from planetary-mass objects like dwarf planets and some moons to the planets and the Sun. This list does not include small Solar System bodies, but it does include a sample of possible planetary-mass objects whose shapes have yet to be determined. The Sun's orbital characteristics are listed in relation to the Galactic Center, while all other objects are listed in order of their distance from the Sun.

Star 

The Sun is a G-type main-sequence star. It contains almost 99.9% of all the mass in the Solar System.

Major planets 

In 2006, the International Astronomical Union (IAU) defined a planet as a body in orbit around the Sun that was large enough to have achieved hydrostatic equilibrium and to have "cleared the neighbourhood around its orbit". The practical meaning of "cleared the neighborhood" is that a planet is comparatively massive enough for its gravitation to control the orbits of all objects in its vicinity. In practice, the term "hydrostatic equilibrium" is interpreted loosely. Mercury is round but not actually in hydrostatic equilibrium, but it is universally regarded as a planet nonetheless.

According to the IAU's explicit count, there are eight planets in the Solar System; four terrestrial planets (Mercury, Venus, Earth, and Mars) and four giant planets, which can be divided further into two gas giants (Jupiter and Saturn) and two ice giants (Uranus and Neptune). When excluding the Sun, the four giant planets account for more than 99% of the mass of the Solar System.

Dwarf planets 

Dwarf planets are bodies orbiting the Sun that are massive and warm enough to have achieved hydrostatic equilibrium, but have not cleared their neighbourhoods of similar objects. Since 2008, there have been five dwarf planets recognized by the IAU, although only Pluto has actually been confirmed to be in hydrostatic equilibrium (Ceres is close to equilibrium, though some anomalies remain unexplained). Ceres orbits in the asteroid belt, between Mars and Jupiter. The others all orbit beyond Neptune.

Astronomers usually refer to solid bodies such as Ceres as dwarf planets, even if they are not strictly in hydrostatic equilibrium. They generally agree that several other trans-Neptunian objects may be large enough to be dwarf planets, given current uncertainties. However, there has been disagreement on the required size. Early speculations were based on the small moons of the giant planets, which attain roundness around a threshold of 200 km radius. However, these moons are at higher temperatures than TNOs and are icier than TNOs are likely to be.

They have densities too low to be solid mixtures of ice and rock, which the larger TNOs are. It was once considered that this was because they were predominantly icy like some moons of Saturn, but TNOs both above and below this size range contain significant rock fractions, and William Grundy et al. pointed out that there is no evolutionary mechanism that would allow large and small TNOs to be rocky while medium ones would not be. They hypothesise instead that medium-sized TNOs are also rocky, and have low densities because they retain internal porosity from their formation, and hence are not planetary bodies (as planetary bodies have sufficient gravitation to collapse out such porosity). Ice–rock mixtures at Kuiper belt temperatures are expected to be strong enough to support significant open spaces in objects up to 350 km radius. At 450 km radius, the interior might eventually start to collapse, but the process might not reach the surface, which would remain cold and uncompressed (as collapsing out porosity would shrink an object, likely differentiated objects now in this size range like Orcus were probably once even larger). Dark surfaces indicate that a body has never been resurfaced (in contrast to Orcus and Charon with bright, relatively clean water ice on their surfaces), and thus that it has at most incompletely differentiated (and might not have differentiated at all). This is roughly in agreement with estimates from an IAU question-and-answer press release from 2006, giving 400 km radius and  mass as cut-offs that normally would be enough for hydrostatic equilibrium, while stating that observation would be needed to determine the status of borderline cases.

If this assessment is correct, then only the largest few TNOs could be dwarf planets. This assessment considered 120347 Salacia (radius ) and 174567 Varda (radius ) to also be dark and low-density bodies; later studies suggest nonetheless that their densities might be higher, potentially high enough to be solid.

The only known additional TNOs that have a radius greater than 450 km are Gonggong, Quaoar, Sedna, and probably Orcus. Lowering the cutoff to 400 km increases the certainty for Orcus, and adds Salacia and perhaps also , though 's mass is unknown and Salacia's is just below the IAU Q&A's stated mass limit. Astronomers generally agree that the first four are dwarf planets, while disagreeing on smaller bodies. Gonggong, Orcus, and Quaoar have moons that have allowed their mass and density to be determined using Kepler's third law, and they are either bright enough (Orcus) to suggest resurfacing and thus planetary geology at least at some point in their past, or are dense enough (Gonggong and Quaoar) that they are clearly solid bodies and thus at least potentially dwarf planets. Sedna, which is bright but has unknown density, has been included as a strong additional candidate. Salacia, being the only other candidate known to be over 400 km radius, has been included as a sample object at the borderline: it is dark, but might be dense enough to be solid, and is above the IAU Q&A's cutoff radius and just below its cutoff mass.

As for objects in the asteroid belt, none are generally agreed as dwarf planets today among astronomers other than Ceres. The second- through fifth-largest asteroids have been discussed as candidates. Vesta (radius ), the second-largest asteroid, appears to have a differentiated interior and therefore likely was once a dwarf planet, but it is no longer very round today. Pallas (radius ), the third-largest asteroid, appears never to have completed differentiation and likewise has an irregular shape. Vesta and Pallas are nonetheless sometimes considered small terrestrial planets anyway by sources preferring a geophysical definition, because they do share similarities to the rocky planets of the inner solar system. The fourth-largest asteroid, Hygiea (radius ), is icy. The question remains open if it is currently in hydrostatic equilibrium: while Hygiea is round today, it was probably previously catastrophically disrupted and today might be just a gravitational aggregate of the pieces. The fifth-largest asteroid, Interamnia (radius ), is icy and has a shape consistent with hydrostatic equilibrium for a slightly shorter rotation period than it now has.

Satellites 

There are at least 20 natural satellites in the Solar System that are known to be massive enough to be close to hydrostatic equilibrium: seven of Saturn, five of Uranus, four of Jupiter, and one each of Earth, Neptune, Pluto, and Eris. Alan Stern calls these satellite planets, although the term major moon is more common. The smallest natural satellite that is gravitationally rounded is Saturn I Mimas (radius ). This is smaller than the largest natural satellite that is known not to be gravitationally rounded, Neptune VIII Proteus (radius ).

Several of these were once in equilibrium but are no longer: these include Earth's moon and all of the moons listed for Saturn apart from Titan and Rhea. The status of Callisto, Titan, and Rhea is uncertain, as is that of the moons of Uranus, Pluto and Eris. The other large moons (Io, Europa, Ganymede, and Triton) are generally believed to still be in equilibrium today. Other moons that were once in equilibrium but are no longer very round, such as Saturn IX Phoebe (radius ), are not included. In addition to not being in equilibrium, Mimas and Tethys have very low densities and it has been suggested that they may have non-negligible internal porosity, in which case they would not be satellite planets.

The satellite of Orcus (Vanth) is larger than Mimas, and about the size of Proteus. However, it is not included in the table as too little is known about it. It is a dark body in the size range that should allow for internal porosity.

Satellites are listed first in order from the Sun, and second in order from their parent body. For the round moons, this mostly matches the Roman numeral designations, with the exceptions of Iapetus and the Uranian system. This is because the Roman numeral designations originally reflected distance from the parent planet and were updated for each new discovery until 1851, but by 1892, the numbering system for the then-known satellites had become "frozen" and from then on followed order of discovery. Thus Miranda (discovered 1948) is Uranus V despite being the innermost of Uranus' five round satellites. The missing Saturn VII is Hyperion, which is not large enough to be round (mean radius ).

See also 

 List of Solar System objects by size
 Lists of astronomical objects
 List of former planets
 Planetary-mass object

Notes

Unless otherwise cited:

Manual calculations (unless otherwise cited)

Individual calculations

Other notes

References 

Hydrostatic equilibrium